Goli Otok is a barren, uninhabited island that was the site of a political prison which was in use when Croatia was part of Yugoslavia. The prison was in operation between 1949 and 1989.

Exposed to strong bora winds, particularly in the winter, the island's surface is almost completely devoid of vegetation, giving Goli Otok (literally, 'barren island' in Croatian) its name. It is also known as the "Croatian Alcatraz" because of its island location and high security.

Goli Otok prison

Despite having long been an occasional grazing ground for local shepherds' flocks, the barren island was apparently never permanently settled other than by the prisoners during the 20th century. Throughout World War I, Austria-Hungary sent Russian prisoners of war from the Eastern Front to Goli Otok.

In 1949, the entire island was officially made into a high-security, top secret prison and labor camp run by the authorities of the People's Federal Republic of Yugoslavia, together with the nearby Sveti Grgur island, which held a similar camp for female prisoners. Until 1956, following the Tito–Stalin split and throughout the Informbiro period, it was used to incarcerate political prisoners. These included known and alleged Stalinists, but also other Communist Party of Yugoslavia members or even non-party citizens accused of exhibiting sympathy or leanings towards the Soviet Union.

Many anti-communists (Serbian, Croatian, Macedonian, Albanian and other nationalists etc.) were also incarcerated on Goli Otok. Non-political prisoners were also sent to the island to serve out simple criminal sentences and some of them were sentenced to death. A total of approximately 16,000 political prisoners served there, of which between 400 and 600 died on the island. Other sources, largely based on various individual statements, claim almost 4,000 prisoners died in the camp.

The prison was entirely inmate-run, and its hierarchical system forced the convicts into beating, humiliating, denouncing and shunning each other. Those who cooperated could hope to rise up the hierarchy and receive better treatment.

After Yugoslavia normalized relations with the Soviet Union, Goli Otok prison passed to the provincial jurisdiction of the People's Republic of Croatia (as opposed to the Yugoslav federal authorities). Regardless, the prison remained a taboo topic in Yugoslavia until the early 1980s. Antonije Isaković wrote the novel Tren (Moment) about the prison in 1979, waiting until after Josip Broz Tito's death in 1980 to release it. The book became an instant bestseller.

The prison was shut down on 30 December 1988 and completely abandoned in 1989. Since then it has been left to ruin. It has since become a tourist attraction and is populated by shepherds from Rab. Former Croatian prisoners are organized into the Association of Former Political Prisoners of Goli Otok. In Serbia, they are organized into the Society of Goli Otok.

Notable prisoners

Šaban Bajramović, Serbian Romani musician
Panko Brashnarov, Macedonian politician
Vlado Dapčević, Yugoslav Montenegrin communist revolutionary and partisan
Adem Demaçi, Kosovo Albanian politician and author
Teki Dervishi, Albanian writer
Vlado Dijak, Yugoslav Bosnian Serb writer and partisan
Alija Izetbegović, former president of Bosnia and Herzegovina
Nikola Kljusev, former Prime Minister of Macedonia
Tine Logar, Slovenian linguist
Venko Markovski, Macedonian writer
Dragoljub Mićunović, Serbian partisan, sociologist, and politician
Dragoslav Mihailović, Serbian writer
Alfred Pal, Croatian painter and graphic designer
Dobroslav Paraga, Croatian politician

Aleksandar Popović, Serbian writer

Igor Torkar, Slovenian writer
Vlasta Velisavljević, Serbian actor
Ante Zemljar, Croatian partisan and writer
Savo Zlatić, Croatian physician and politician
Vitomil Zupan, Slovenian writer

Goli Otok in literature

1981: Noč do jutra (Night till Morning Comes) ‒ novel by Slovenian author Branko Hofman
1981: Herezia e Dervish Mallutes - allegorical novel by Kosovar author Teki Dervishi
1982: Tren 2 - novel by Antonije Isaković
1984: Umiranje na obroke (Dying by Installments) ‒ autobiographical book by Slovenian author Igor Torkar, about Goli Otok prison conditions
1984: Goli Otok: The Island of Death ‒ non-fiction book by Bulgarian/Macedonian author Venko Markovski, detailing a history of Goli Otok prison
1990: Goli Otok by Dragoslav Mihailović
1993: Lov na stenice by Dragoslav Mihailović
1996: Goli Otok: stratište duha ‒ non-fiction book by Croatian author Mihovil Horvat, containing the events of his arrest and imprisonment during Informbiro period
1997: Goli Otok: Italiani nel Gulag di Tito ‒ historical report by Italian-Croatian author Giacomo Scotti
1997: Zlotvori – novel by Dragoslav Mihailović
1997: Tito's Hawaii ‒ novel by author using the pen-name Rade Panic (name taken from a political victim of the same name whose wife was interred on the island; not his actual name) 
2005: Razglednica s ljetovanja ‒ autobiographical short novel by the Croatian author Dubravka Ugrešić; published in the Belgrade literary review REČ časopis za književnost i kulturu, i društvena pitanja, br. 74/20, 2006, and in the book Nikog nema doma, ed. devedeset stupnjeva, Zagreb 2005. Italian translation Cartolina Estiva by Luka Zanoni Osservatorio Balcani e Caucaso, 2008
2010: Island of the World - novel by Canadian author, Michael D. O'Brien.
2019: Life Plays with Me (Published in North America as More Than I Love My Life) - novel by Israeli writer David Grossman. One of the main characters, Vera, was interned as a political prisoner in Goli Otok before immigrating to Israel.

Goli Otok in film and television
1996: The Seventh Chronicle (Sedma kronika) – Croatian feature film about a Goli Otok inmate who escapes by swimming to the island of Rab, based on a novel by Grgo Gamulin
2002: Eva ‒ documentary film told in German, Hebrew and English recounting the experiences of Eva Panić-Nahir, a former prisoner of the island; produced/directed by Avner Faingulernt
2009: Strahota - Die Geschichte der Gefängnisinsel Goli Otok ‒ German-language documentary film with 8 former prisoners; produced/directed by Reinhard Grabher
2012: Goli Otok ‒ documentary film directed by Darko Bavoljak
2013: Lost Survivors ‒ Travel Channel reality TV survival series episode entitled "Prison Island"
2014: Goli – documentary film directed by Tiha K. Gudac
2014: In the Name of the People ‒ exhibition in Belgrade; with an alphabetical list of 16,500 names of people who were jailed at the Goli Otok available for online search on their website
2019: Mysteries of the Abandoned ‒ Season 4 Episode 9 "Haunting on Plague Island"

References

Sources

Further reading
Ekohistorijski aspekti proučavanja logora na Golom otoku 1949.-1956.
https://www.lopar.com/hrv/turisticka_ponuda/izleti/goli_otok.php

External links

www.goli-otok.hr
www.goli-otok.com
Comparative criminology | Europe - Yugoslavia
Goli Otok: Hell in the Adriatic is the true story of Josip Zoretic's tragic experience and survival as a political prisoner of the former Yugoslavia's most notorious prison, Goli Otok, and the circumstances that led to his imprisonment 

Uninhabited islands of Croatia
Islands of the Adriatic Sea
Defunct prisons in Croatia
Political repression in Communist Yugoslavia
Prisons in Yugoslavia
Prison islands
Landforms of Primorje-Gorski Kotar County